Vero Beach South is a census-designated place (CDP) in Indian River County, Florida, United States. The population was 23,092 at the 2010 census. It is part of the Sebastian–Vero Beach Metropolitan Statistical Area.

Geography

According to the United States Census Bureau, this unincorporated area in Indian River County has a total area of 10.9 square miles (28.2 km), of which 10.3 square miles (26.8 km) is land and 0.6 square mile (1.5 km) (5.23%) is water.

Demographics

As of the census of 2000, there were 20,362 people, 8,649 households, and 5,881 families residing in the CDP. The racial makeup of the CDP was 94.18% White, 2.29% African American, 0.32% Native American, 0.94% Asian, 0.07% Pacific Islander, 0.79% from other races, and 1.40% from two or more races. Hispanic or Latino of any race were 3.37% of the population.

There were 8,649 households, out of which 27.0% had children under the age of 18 living with them, 54.7% were married couples living together, 10.2% had a female householder with no husband present, and 32.0% were non-families. 26.8% of all households were made up of individuals, and 13.3% had someone living alone who was 65 years of age or older.  The average household size was 2.34 and the average family size was 2.81.

In the CDP, the population was spread out, with 21.9% under the age of 18, 5.8% from 18 to 24, 25.3% from 25 to 44, 25.1% from 45 to 64, and 21.9% who were 65 years of age or older.  The median age was 43 years. For every 100 females, there were 90.8 males.  For every 100 females age 18 and over, there were 86.7 males.

The median income for a household in the CDP was $39,569, and the median income for a family was $46,664. Males had a median income of $32,079 versus $24,506 for females. The per capita income for the CDP was $21,604.  About 4.6% of families and 7.6% of the population were below the poverty line, including 8.4% of those under age 18 and 7.9% of those age 65 or over.

References

Census-designated places in Indian River County, Florida
Census-designated places in Florida
Populated places on the Intracoastal Waterway in Florida